is a railway station in Sakurai, Nara Prefecture, Japan. Although the station is on the Sakurai Line as rail infrastructure, it has been served by the Man-yō Mahoroba Line since 2010 in terms of passenger train services. Sakurai Station is also served by the Osaka Line of the Kintetsu Railway.

Contactless smart cards including ICOCA (JR-West) and PiTaPa (Surutto KANSAI) are available on both rail systems.

Lines
  JR-West
  Man-yō Mahoroba Line
  Kintetsu Railway
  Osaka Line

Layout
The elevated Kintetsu Osaka Line and the ground JR-West Sakurai Line are connected by a footbridge.

JR-West platforms
The JR-West station has one side platform and one island platform serving three tracks.

Kintetsu Railway platforms
The Kintetsu station has two side platforms serving one track each.

See also
 List of railway stations in Japan

External links

 Official website (JR-West) 
 

Railway stations in Japan opened in 1893
Railway stations in Japan opened in 1929
Railway stations in Nara Prefecture